Andrey Robertovich Kovalyov (born 2 April 1966) is a Belarusian ice hockey player. He competed in the men's tournaments at the 1998 Winter Olympics and the 2002 Winter Olympics.

Kovalyov was selected by the Washington Capitals in the 1983 NHL Entry Draft, and spent several years in the minor leagues of North America.

Career statistics

Regular season and playoffs

International

References

External links
 

1966 births
Living people
Belarusian expatriate sportspeople in Germany
Belarusian expatriate sportspeople in the United States
Olympic ice hockey players of Belarus
Greensboro Monarchs players
Ice hockey players at the 1998 Winter Olympics
Ice hockey players at the 2002 Winter Olympics
HC Davos players
HC Dinamo Minsk players
HC Dynamo Moscow players
Heilbronner Falken players
Krefeld Pinguine players
Muskegon Fury players
New Haven Nighthawks players
Sportspeople from Vitebsk
Revier Löwen players
SC Bietigheim-Bissingen players
Schwenninger Wild Wings players
Soviet ice hockey players
Washington Capitals draft picks
Yunost Minsk players